Laughter and Tears (also known as Circus Jim) is a 1921 British-Dutch silent drama film directed by B. E. Doxat-Pratt.  The film is extant in copies at the British Film Institute(BFI) and the Nederlands Filmmuseum.

Cast
 Evelyn Brent - Pierrette
 Adelqui Migliar - Mario Mari
 Dorothy Fane - Countess Maltakoff
 E. Story Gofton - Adolpho
 Maudie Dunham - Zizi
 Bert Darley - Ferrado
 Nico De Jong - Police commissioner
 Norman Doxat-Pratt
 Reginald Garton - Georgio Lario

References

External links 
 

1921 films
British silent feature films
Dutch silent feature films
British black-and-white films
Dutch black-and-white films
1921 drama films
British drama films
Dutch drama films
1920s British films
Silent drama films